Florencio Javier Morán Manzo (born 27 March 1987) is a former football goalkeeper who last played for Loros UdeC in the Ascenso MX.

Club career
After several seasons as a back-up goalkeeper.

References

External links
 
 

1987 births
Living people
Mexican footballers
Club Puebla players
Atlas F.C. footballers
Leones Negros UdeG footballers
Loros UdeC footballers
Ascenso MX players
Association football goalkeepers